Microcondylaea is a genus of freshwater mussels in the family Unionidae, the river mussels.

Species
 Microcondylaea compressa (Menke, 1828)

References

Unionidae
Bivalve genera